Alexandra Schepisi is an Australian actress.

Early life
Schepisi was born and raised in Melbourne, Victoria, Australia. She is the daughter of filmmaker Fred Schepisi and Australian Casting director Rhonda (nee Finlayson) Schepisi]. She obtained her bachelor's degree in dramatic art from Victorian College of the Arts in 1997.

Career
Schepisi made her acting debut in the drama film The Chant of Jimmie Blacksmith (1978), which her father scripted and directed. She would later star in another film of his father's, The Eye of the Storm (2011).

Schepisi has also performed on stage, including the Melbourne Theatre Company production A Doll's House.

Over the years, Schepisi went on to star in a number of Australian films and television shows. Her TV acting credits include The Secret Life of Us (2001), MDA (2002), Underbelly (2008), and Devil's Dust (2012). On the other hand, she starred in films The Boys Are Back (2009), Matching Jack (2010).

Schepisi has directed two short films.

Filmography

Films

Television

Awards

References

External links

Living people
Australian film actresses
Australian stage actresses
Australian television actresses
Actresses from Melbourne
Year of birth missing (living people)
20th-century Australian actresses
21st-century Australian actresses